Env or ENV may refer to:
env, a Unix shell utility
ENV, a hydrogen motorcycle
 IATA code for Wendover Airport
Env (gene), a viral envelope
LG enV (VX9900), a Verizon cellular phone
General Motors EN-V, an electric autonomous vehicle with cabin on two wheels
E.N.V. Motor Syndicate, an early Anglo-French aircraft engine company
Education for Nature - Vietnam, a Vietnamese wildlife protection NGO